Oscar Grossheim (April 3, 1862 - November 2, 1954) was an American photographer known for his portraiture and documentary photographs of the pearl button industry, store displays and local life along the Upper Mississippi River Valley.

Early life 
Oscar Grossheim was born 3 April 1862, in Muscatine, IA. His parents, Theodore and Bertha Grossheim, emigrated to Muscatine from Berlin, Germany in 1860 along with their eldest son, Alexander.

On October 16, 1884, Grossheim married his first wife, Anna McCart. After her death, he married Bertha Oberman of Muscatine June 8, 1892. Grossheim had two daughters and a son, who died in infancy.

Career 
As a young boy, Grossheim was apprenticed to an area photographer, J.G. Evans, who used the wet plate collodion process to produce glass plate negatives.

In 1887, with his older brother Alexander, Oscar opened what would later become Berlin Studio, a photography studio, located at 117-119 East 2nd St. in Muscatine, Iowa. In 1892, the brothers parted ways and Oscar opened his own studio at 309 East 2nd St., where he worked until 1898. That same year, he built his permanent studio building at 317 E. 2nd St., and remained there until his retirement in May 1954.

Grossheim's body of work, which consists of approximately 55,000 glass plate negatives, is maintained by Musser Public Library in Muscatine, IA. The library has digitized and made available online over 4,000 images which can be viewed on the Upper Mississippi Valley Digital Image Archive.

The subject matter of Grossheim's work includes individual portrait studio sessions, group photos, documentation of the area pearl button industry, and storefront displays.

According to an article in the Muscatine Journal, Grossheim met George Eastman of Eastman Kodak Co. at a convention of the members of the Photographers' Association of America (later changed to the Professional Photographers of America) in the 1880s, in Minneapolis, MN. The article goes on to state that Mr. Grossheim and Mr. Eastman discussed a prototype of the portable camera and that they visited one another in their respective places of business.

Notes

External links 
The City of Muscatine website
Musser Public Library
Kodak Company

American portrait photographers
1862 births
1954 deaths
Artists from Iowa
People from Muscatine, Iowa
19th-century American photographers
20th-century American photographers